Petra Špalková (born 21 February 1975 in Brno) is a Czech actress. In 1997 she was guest actor at the Divadlo v Dlouhé.

Filmography

Film

Television

Awards

References

External links
 
 
 Petra Špalková at KinoBox
 
 Petra Špalková at TCMd

1975 births
Living people
Czech film actresses
Czech television actresses
Actors from Brno
20th-century Czech actresses
21st-century Czech actresses
Charles University alumni
Czech stage actresses
Czech Lion Awards winners
Recipients of the Thalia Award